With the exception of mail from Mainland China, postal codes are not used in Hong Kong as the Hongkong Post deems it unnecessary to adopt such a system. Hongkong Post advised to leave the postcode field blank or try to fill in with "000", "0000", "000000" or "HKG" wherever required. The People's Republic of China's national postal service, China Post, has allocated postal code 999077 to Hong Kong, although this is only sporadically used when sending mail from Mainland China. As China Post does not serve Hong Kong, this code is generally not used in any other scenarios and remains little-known.

Background 
Hong Kong has been a special administrative region of the People's Republic of China (PRC) since 1997. Between 1841 and 1997, Hong Kong was a Crown Colony of the United Kingdom, and the colonial government-established postal service, the Hongkong Post, was retained after the 1997 handover. As such, postal service remained and remains separate from the rest of the PRC under the one country, two systems principle.

Given Hong Kong’s compact size, postal codes have never been introduced as it would bring little benefit to the already-efficient postal service. In 2000, city officials once considered a post code system for the city, but the idea was not implemented.

The China Post-designated postal code, 999077, is one of the 9-series codes that China Post uses for international and interregional mail sent from Mainland China.

Addressing postal items 
Hongkong Post recommends to address letters using recipient name, flat number, building name, house number, street and village or district.

See also 
 List of postal codes in China

References 

Hong Kong
Postal system of Hong Kong
Postal system of China